Krapivny (masculine), Krapivnaya (feminine), or Krapivnoye (neuter) is the name of several rural localities in Russia:
Krapivnoye, Shebekinsky District, Belgorod Oblast, a selo in Shebekinsky District, Belgorod Oblast
Krapivnoye, Yakovlevsky District, Belgorod Oblast, a selo in Yakovlevsky District, Belgorod Oblast
Krapivnaya, a village in Serovsky District of Sverdlovsk Oblast